The Building at 1209–1217 Maple Avenue is a historic rowhouse building in Evanston, Illinois. Built in 1892, the three-story building consists of five rowhouses. The building was one of several rowhouses built in Evanston in the late nineteenth century; the rowhouses were a precursor to the city's wave of suburban apartments, which also offered house-like living in a multi-unit building. Prominent Chicago architects Holabird & Roche designed the building in the Queen Anne style. The building features porches at each unit's entrance, projecting bays, and a gambrel gable and two triangular gables separated by dormers.

The building was added to the National Register of Historic Places on March 15, 1984.

References

Buildings and structures on the National Register of Historic Places in Cook County, Illinois
Residential buildings on the National Register of Historic Places in Illinois
Buildings and structures in Evanston, Illinois
Queen Anne architecture in Illinois
Residential buildings completed in 1892